Robert Younger, Baron Blanesburgh,  (12 September 1861 – 17 August 1946) was a Scottish barrister and judge.

The son of James Younger and Janet McEwan (both important Scottish brewing families), and younger brother of the 1st Viscount Younger of Leckie, he was educated at Edinburgh Academy and Balliol College, Oxford, where he graduated with a Bachelor of Arts in 1883, and with a Master of Arts in 1909.

In 1884 Younger was called to the Bar by the Inner Temple. He was appointed a Queen's Counsel in January 1900, and became a Bencher of Lincoln's Inn in 1907. Between 1915 and 1919, he was High Court Judge, Chancery Division. Invested as a Privy Counsellor on 25 November 1919, he was Lord Justice of Appeal from 1919 to 1923. On 12 October 1923, he was appointed Lord of Appeal in Ordinary and was created a life peer with the title Baron Blanesburgh, of Alloa in the County of Clackmannanshire. As a judge, Blanesburgh was noted for his formalism. He retired in 1937 due to poor eyesight.

Having been knighted on 20 April 1915, he was made a Knight Grand Cross of the Order of the British Empire (GBE) in 1917. Younger was a fellow of the Royal College of Music and received honorary doctorates of the University of Oxford, University of St Andrews and the University of Edinburgh. In 1932, he became further Treasurer of Lincoln's Inn. He died aged 84having never married.

Trivia

Lord Blanesburgh presented the west stained glass window, representing the Tree of Jesse, in Dunblane Cathedral in 1906 in memory of his mother, Janet McEwan. It was designed and created by Clayton and Bell of London

Arms

References

1861 births
1946 deaths
Alumni of Balliol College, Oxford
Knights Grand Cross of the Order of the British Empire
Blanesburgh 
Blanesburgh 
Members of the Privy Council of the United Kingdom
Members of the Judicial Committee of the Privy Council
People educated at Edinburgh Academy
19th-century English lawyers
20th-century English judges
Chancery Division judges
Knights Bachelor
Lords Justices of Appeal
Life peers created by George V